Om Prakash Singh (born 2 January 1960) is a 1983 batch IPS officer of Uttar Pradesh cadre. He was the Director General of Uttar Pradesh Police, and had previously served as the Director General of CISF and Director General of NDRF.

Education 
Singh is a postgraduate (MA) in Political Science from Allahabad University, he also holds a postgraduate degree (MPhil) in Philosophy from National Defence College, affiliated to Madras University. Singh has also earned MBA degree in Disaster Management.

Career 
Singh has served in various key positions for both Union and Uttar Pradesh Governments (Police), like as the Director General of Uttar Pradesh Police, He travelled to Hungary in exchange to become the Additional Director General (ADG) of NCR (Meerut) Zone, Additional Director General (Intelligence), Additional Director General (Special Enquiry), Deputy Inspector General (DIG) of Moradabad and Azamgarh ranges, Deputy Inspector General (Anti Corruption Organization) and Commandant of 11th Battalion of Provincial Armed Constabulary in Uttar Pradesh Governments (Police), and as Director General of Central Industrial Security Force (CISF), Director General of National Disaster Response Force (NDRF), Additional Director General in CISF, Inspector General/Deputy Inspector General (IG/DIG) in Central Reserve Police Force.

Singh has also served as the District Senior Superintendent of Police/Superintendent of Police (SSP/SP) of Lucknow, Allahabad, Moradabad, Lakhimpur Kheri and Amroha.

DG of CISF 
He was appointed as the Director General of Central Industrial Security Force by the Appointments Committee of the Cabinet in September 2016. He assumed the office of DG on 26 September 2016.

DG of UPP 
Singh assumed charge as the Director General of Uttar Pradesh Police on 23 January 2018.

He was appointed as the Director General of Uttar Pradesh Police by the Chief Minister of Uttar Pradesh, on the recommendation of a high-level committee consisting of the Chief Secretary of Uttar Pradesh, Rajive Kumar, as its head, with the other members being Principal Secretary (Home) Arvind Kumar and Principal Secretary to the Chief Minister, Shashi Prakash Goyal.

Singh has had an eventful tenure, and holds credit for introducing police commissionerate system in Lucknow and Noida, organising of an incident free Kumbh Mela in Prayagraj, and maintaining the law and order during the Ram Janmbhoomi verdict in 2019.

Decorations 

  Police Medal for meritorious service - Received on 15 August 1999
  President's Police Medal for distinguished service - Received on 26 January 2007
  50th Independence Anniversary Medal - Received on 15 August 1997
  Police Medal for Gallantry - Received in 1993

Controversies 
Singh was the Senior Superintendent of Police (SSP) of Lucknow district when the infamous attack on Mayawati in a VIP guesthouse happened. Subsequently, he was suspended by the Government of Uttar Pradesh.

During his tenure as Additional Director General (ADG) of Meerut (NCR) zone, violence in Phase-II of Noida city happened. Subsequently, he was transferred by the Government of Uttar Pradesh and was attached to DGP Headquarters.

References

External links 
 Executive Record Sheet as maintained by Ministry of Home Affairs of Government of India
 Profile on National Disaster Response Force's website

University of Madras alumni
People from Gaya district
People from Gaya, India
Living people
Indian Police Service officers
Indian police chiefs
Director Generals of Uttar Pradesh Police
1960 births
National Defence College, India alumni